Aro Tolbukhin: In the Mind of a Killer is a 2002 film, written and directed by Isaac Pierre Racine, Agustí Villaronga, and Lydia Zimmermann. It was the 2003 Mexican submission for the Academy Award for Best Foreign Language Film.

Plot
The film tells the story of Aro Tolbukhin, a Hungarian salesman who sets fire to seven people in an infirmary in a mission in Guatemala. The film follows his life, from his childhood in Hungary to his arrival in Guatemala, in an attempt to determine his motivations.

Cast
Daniel Giménez Cacho as Adult Aro
Carmen Beato as Sister Carmen
Zoltán Józan as Teenage Aro
Mariona Castillo as Teenage Selma
Aram González as Young Aro
Eva Fortea as Young Selma
Jesús Ramos as Father
Pepa Charro as Dada

See also 
 List of Spanish films of 2002

External links
 

2002 drama films
2002 films
2000s business films
Catalan films
Catalan-language films
Films directed by Agustí Villaronga
Films directed by Isaac Pierre Racine
Films directed by Lydia Zimmermann
Films about children
Films about death
Films set in Budapest
Films set in Guatemala
Films shot in Canada
Films shot in Guatemala
Films shot in Hungary
Films shot in Mexico
Films shot in Spain
Films set in hospitals
Spanish drama films
Spanish independent films
2000s Spanish-language films
Women and death
2002 directorial debut films
2000s Spanish films
Films about salespeople